Kukmor (Kukmara) is an urban locality (an urban-type settlement) and the administrative center of Kukmorsky District in the Republic of Tatarstan, Russia, located on the Nurminka River (in the Vyatka's basin), near the border with Kirov Oblast,  from the republic's capital of Kazan. As of the 2010 Census, its population was 16,918.

History
It was established in the second quarter of the 18th century as a wool and wood artisan center and was granted urban-type settlement status in 1928. It serves as a district administrative center since 1930.

Administrative and municipal status
Within the framework of administrative divisions, the urban-type settlement of Kukmor serves as the administrative center of Kukmorsky District, of which it is a part. As a municipal division, Kukmor is incorporated within Kukmorsky Municipal District as Kukmor Urban Settlement.

Economy
As of 1997, Kukmor's industrial facilities included several light and food industry enterprises, as well as a kitchenware plant and a brick factory.

Kukmor railway station lies on the Kazan–Agryz line.

Demographics

As of 1989, the population was mostly Tatar (77.9%), Russian (11.2%), Udmurt (9.2%), and Mari (1.0%).

References

Notes

Sources

Urban-type settlements in the Republic of Tatarstan
Mamadyshsky Uyezd